Calosoma orientale is a species of ground beetle in the subfamily of Carabinae. It was described by Hope in 1838.

References

orientale
Beetles described in 1838